Hesar (Fence) is a 1983 film by the Iranian director Hassan Mohammadzadeh. It was written by Fazlullah Nuri. It starred Jeyran Sharif and Morteza Najafi. It is set during the Iran-Iraq war and is an early example of Sacred Defence cinema.

Cast

References

1980s Persian-language films
Iran–Iraq War films
Iranian war films
1983 films
1980s war films